Keiji Haino ( Haino Keiji; born May 3, 1952) is a Japanese musician and singer-songwriter whose work has included rock, free improvisation, noise music, percussion, psychedelic music, minimalism and drone music. He has been active since the 1970s and continues to record regularly and in new styles.

History
Haino's initial artistic outlet was theatre, inspired by the radical writings of Antonin Artaud. An epiphanic moment came when he heard The Doors' "When The Music's Over" and changed course towards music. After brief stints in a number of blues and experimental outfits, he formed improvisational rock band Lost Aaraaf in 1970. In the mid 1970s, having left Lost Aaraaf, he collaborated with psychedelic multi-instrumentalist Magical Power Mako.

His musical output throughout the late 1970s is scarcely documented, that is until the formation of his rock duo Fushitsusha in 1978 (although their first LP did not surface until 1989). This outfit initially consisted of Haino on guitar and vocals, and Tamio Shiraishi on synthesizer. With the departure of Shiraishi and the addition of Jun Hamano (bass) and Shuhei Takashima (drums), Fushitsusha operated as a trio. The lineup soon changed, with Yasushi Ozawa (bass) and Jun Kosugi (drums) performing throughout the 1990s, but returned to a duo with Haino supplementing percussion with tape-loops.

Haino formed Aihiyo in 1998, principally playing a diverse range of covers (including The Rolling Stones, The Ronettes, and the Jimi Hendrix Experience), transforming the original material into Haino's unique form of garage psychedelia.

NHK, Japan's national broadcaster, banned him from broadcast from 1973 to 2013.

Other groups Haino has formed include Vajra (with underground folk singer Kan Mikami and drummer Toshiaki Ishizuka), Knead (with the avant-prog outfit Ruins), Sanhedolin (with Yoshida Tatsuya of Ruins and Mitsuru Nasuno of Korekyojinn, Altered States and Ground Zero) and a solo project called Nijiumu. He has also collaborated with many artists, including Faust, Boris, Derek Bailey, Joey Baron, Peter Brötzmann, Lee Konitz, Loren Mazzacane Connors, Charles Gayle, Earl Kuck, Bill Laswell, Musica Transonic, Stephen O'Malley, Makigami Koichi, Ayuo, Merzbow, Oren Ambarchi, Jim O'Rourke, John Zorn, Yamantaka Eye, John Duncan, Fred Frith, Charles Hayward and John Butcher.

Style
His main instruments of choice have been guitar and vocals, with many other instruments and approaches incorporated into his career's work. Haino is known for intensely cathartic sound explorations, and despite the fact that much of his work contains varied instrumentation and accompaniment, he retains a distinctive style.

Haino cites a broad range of influences, including troubadour music, Marlene Dietrich, Iannis Xenakis, Blue Cheer, Syd Barrett, and Charlie Parker. At a young age, he had an epiphany through his introduction to The Doors. His recent foray into DJing at Tokyo nightclubs has reportedly reflected his eclectic taste. He has had a long love affair with early blues music, particularly the works of Blind Lemon Jefferson, and is heavily inspired by the Japanese musical concept of "Ma", the silent spaces in music (see Taiko for more information). In a 2012 interview with Time Out Tokyo, he described his approach as "defying the notion that you can't create something from nothing." He also has a keen interest in Butoh dancing and collecting ethnic instruments.

Haino's uniqueness extends to his lifestyle: he has sported the same long hair, black clothes and sunglasses throughout his career, and is a strict straight edge vegetarian who has refrained from alcohol, tobacco and recreational drugs for his entire life.

Discography

Solo albums

{| class="wikitable"
|-
! Date
! Album name
! Label/catalogue number
! Notes
|-
| 1981-06-01
| Watashi dake? (わたしだけ?, "Only Me?")
| Pinakotheca PRL#2
|-
| 1990-10-25
| Nijiumu (滲有無, "Infiltration")
| P.S.F. Records PSF-7
|-
| 1992
| Itsukushimi (慈, "Affection")
| P.S.F. Records PSF-23
| Recorded live on 1991-12-30.
|-
| 1994
| Beginning and End, Interwoven
|-
| 1994
| I Said, This Is the Son of Nihilism
|-
| 1995
| Tenshi No Gijinka
|-
| 1995 
| The 21st Century Hard-y-Guide-y Man
|-
| 1997
| So, Black Is Myself
|-
| 1997
| Keeping on Breathing
|-
| 1998-06-24
| The 21st Century Hard-y-Guide-y Man (Even Now, Still I Think)
| J-Factory TKCF-77023
|-
| 2001
| Abandon All Words at a Stroke, So That Prayer Can Come Spilling Out
|- 
| 2002
| To Start With, Let's Remove the Colour!!
|-
| 2003
| Light Darkness Melting Into One This Vibration
|-
| 2004
| Black Blues (acoustic and electric versions)
|-
| 2005
| Tangled Up in the Universe, My Pain''
|-
| 2005
| Global Ancient Atmosphere|-
| 2006
| やらないが　できないことに　なってゆく|-
| 2008 
| The 21st Century Hard-y-Guide-y Man: こいつから失せたいためのはかりごと|-
| 2011 
| Un autre chemin vers l'Ultime
|}

Kaii Abe (collaboration with unknown musicians) (1982)
Live in the first year of the Heisei, Volume One (with Kan Mikami and Motoharu Yoshizawa (1990)
Live in the first year of the Heisei, Volume Two (with Kan Mikami and Motoharu Yoshizawa (1990)
Live at Lazyways, Koenji, Tokyo (with Toshi Ishizuka) (1992)
<live> 30 – June – 1992 (1992)
Execration that accept to acknowledge (1993)
Ama No Gawa (Milky Way) (1993)
Guitar Works (7")(1994)
Hikari=Shi" (light=death) (Maki Miura, Keiji Haino, and Ogreish Organism) (1994)
Two strings will do it (Barre Phillips, Keiji Haino, and Sabu Toyozumi) (1994)
Live at Downtown Music Gallery (Keiji Haino and Loren Mazzacane Connors) (1995)
A Challenge to Fate (1995, reissued 2004)
Tenshi No Gijinka (1995)
I said, This is the son of nihilism (1995)
Twenty-first Century Hard-y Guide-y Man (1995)
Etchings in the air (Barre Phillips and Keiji Haino) (1996)
Evolving Blush or Driving Original Sin (with Peter Brötzmann) (1996)
Gerry Miles (with Alan Licht) (1996)
The Book of "Eternity Set Aflame" (1996)
Saying I love you, I continue to curse myself (1996)
Drawing Close, Attuning—The Respective Signs of Order and Chaos (with Derek Bailey) (1997)
Vol. 2 (Keiji Haino and Loren Mazza Cane Connors) (1997)
Keeping on breathing (April 21, 1997)
Sruthi Box (promotional release) (April 21, 1997)
So, black is myself (May 1, 1997)
The 21st Century Hard-y Guide-y Man (1998)
Incubation (with Musica Transonic) (1998)
Black:  Implication Flooding (with Boris) (1998)
Even Now, Still I Think (June 24, 1998)
An Unclear Trial:  More Than This (with Greg Cohen and Joey Baron) (November 1998/January 1999)
Y (with Jean-Francois Pauvros) (January 2000)
The Strange Face (with Shoji Hano) (September 2000)
Shadow – Live in Wels, Austria (with Shoji Hano and Peter Brötzmann) (September 2000)
Ichioku to ichibanme no inori o michibiki daseba ii (with Coa) (October 2000) - translation:  You should draw out the billion and first prayer
Songs (with Derek Bailey) (December 2000)
Abandon all words at a stroke, so that prayer can come spilling out (May 2001)
Until Water Grasps Flame (with Yoshida Tatsuya) (January 2002)
Mazu wa iro o nakusouka!! (November 5, 2002)
Free Rock (Doo-Dooettes + Keiji Haino + Rick Potts) (November 25, 2002)
"C'est parfait" endoctriné tu tombes la tête la première (January 2003)
Hikari yami uchitokeaishi kono hibiki (December 24, 2003)
Koko (December 24, 2003)
Live at Cafe Independents Friday 23. January. 2004 (Keiji Haino, Tatsuya Yoshida & Mitsuru Natsuno + Bus Ratch) (June 2004)
Tayu tayu to tadayoitamae kono furue (with Michihiro Sato) (July 2004)
Next Let's Try Changing the Shape (April 2004, January 2005)
Black Blues (soft version) (May 2004)
Black Blues (violent version) (May 2004)
Uchu Ni Karami Tsuite Iru Waga Itami (March 10, 2005)
kono kehai fujirareteru hajimarini (August 25, 2005)
Reveal'd to none as yet – an expedience to utterly vanish consciousness while still alive (December 2005)
New Rap (with Yoshida Tatsuya) (March 2006)
Homeogryllus japonicus Orchestra 2004 (with Mamoru Fujieda) (April 2006)
Animamima (with Sitaar Tah!) (May 2006)
Yaranai ga dekinai ni natte yuku (August 15, 2006)
Mamono (with KK Null) (November 2006)
Cosmic Debris, Vol.III (with My Cat Is An Alien) (August 2007)
Uhrfasudhasdd (with Yoshida Tatsuya) (May 2008)
Pulverized Purple (with Masami Akita) (July 2008)
Imikuzushi (with Jim O'Rourke and Oren Ambarchi) (2012)
Nazoranai (with Oren Ambarchi and Stephen O'Malley) (2012)
Now While It's Still Warm Let Us Pour in All The Mystery (with Jim O'Rourke and Oren Ambarchi) (2013)
Only Wanting to Melt Beautifully Away… (with Jim O'Rourke and Oren Ambarchi) (2014)Light Never Bright Enough (with John Butcher) (CD/LP 2017)American Dollar Bill – Keep Facing Sideways, You're Too Hideous to Look at Face On'' (with Sumac) (2018)

Fushitsusha

Vajra 
Tsugaru (1995)
Chiru-Ha/Ozakijinjya (CD-single) (1995)
Ring (1996)
"Sichisiki" (The Seventh Consciousness) (1997)
Sravaka (1998)
Mandala Cat Last (2002)
Live 2007 (2007)

Aihiyo 
untitled (1998)
Second Album (2000)

Black stage 
untitled (with Natsuki Kido & Yuji Katsui) (1996)

Purple Trap 
Soul's True Love (4CD) (1995)
Decided... Already The Motionless Heart of Tranquility, Tangling The Prayer Called "I" (1999)

Knead 
1st (May 2002)
This melting happiness – I want you to realize that it is another trap (July 2003)

Sanhedorin 
 Manjoicchi wa muko (August 10, 2005)
 Sukino Godaburyu Ichieichi (December 25, 2013)

Lost Aaraaff 
 untitled (1991)

Nijiumu 
 Era of Sad Wings (1993)
 Live (part of Driftworks 4 CD box-set)

References

External links 
Haino's Official page (Japanese)
Unofficial Keiji Haino Homepage (English)
Discography reviewed at Arcane Candy
Nippop Profile | Keiji Haino
review of Keiji Haino's 2005 'memorial birthday concert'
Exhibition featuring Keiji Haino

A Critical Analysis of Keiji Haino by Costas Kontas (PhD thesis, University of the Arts London)

Japanese guitarists
Avant-garde singers
Experimental guitarists
Noise musicians
Butoh
1952 births
Living people
Alien8 Recordings artists
P.S.F. Records artists
Blast First artists
Musicians from Chiba Prefecture
Incus Records artists
Tzadik Records artists
RareNoiseRecords artists
Thrill Jockey artists
Sub Rosa Records artists